Andrii Volodymyrovych Lysetskyi (born 10 February 1998) is a Ukrainian luger.

Career
At the 2016 Winter Youth Olympics in Lillehammer, Norway, Lysetskyi finished together with Levkovych 13th in the doubles competition. He was also 7th in team relay (together with Smaha, Stakhiv, and Levkovych).

Later on, Lysetskyi was teamed with Ihor Stakhiv. His first World Cup race was during the 2018-19 season in Igls, Austria, where he finished 20th in doubles. As of February 2022, Lysetskyi's best World Cup finish was 10th in the 2019-20 season in Winterberg, Germany.

In 2022, Andrii Lysetskyi was nominated for his first Winter Games in Beijing.

Personal life
Lysetskyi studied radio technologies at the Lviv Polytechnic.

Career results

Winter Olympics

World Championships

European Championships

Luge World Cup

Rankings

References

External links
 
 
 

1998 births
Living people
Sportspeople from Lviv
Ukrainian male lugers
Olympic lugers of Ukraine
Lugers at the 2022 Winter Olympics